Linea Turistica Aereotuy LTA, C.A. was a Venezuelan regional and domestic airline headquartered in Caracas and based at Simón Bolívar International Airport.

History

The airline was established in 1982 and started operations on June 30 of the year. It was part of a full service safari company with its own lodges, camps, guides, aircraft and sailing vessels and operated services to remote destinations in Venezuela, including tourist attractions. It had 300 employees by March 2010.

In October 2014, the airline was forced to suspend its flights to Aruba, affecting more than 7,000 customers. The airline's suspension was due to a failure in an aircraft that covered the route, however the National Institute of Civil Aviation indicated that the suspension was due to the over-sale of tickets for said route, as well as the creation of new unauthorized flights to cover the over-sale. This suspension was maintained until February 28, 2015.

In February 2016, it was announced that LTA was bought by Grupo Cóndor C.A. for which it joined the alliance. 

On July 30, 2018, the airline had ceased all services.

Destinations
The airline flew to the following destinations, with further routes served as charters:

Fleet

Final fleet

As of February 2017, the Línea Turística Aereotuy fleet consisted of the following aircraft:

Former fleet
1 ATR 42-300
1 Beechcraft 1900C
1 Cessna 206
11 Cessna 208B Grand Caravan
1 Cessna 425
1 Cessna Citation V
6 De Havilland Canada DHC-6 Twin Otter
8 Dornier 228
2 Reims-Cessna F406 Caravan II

Accidents and incidents
On July 21, 2007, a Cessna 208B Grand Caravan crashed after an engine failure while taking off. There was no personal injury, but the plane was written off.
On April 17, 2009, a Cessna 208B Grand Caravan (registered YV1181) crashed shortly after taking off from Canaima National Park after failing to gain sufficient altitude, killing one person. The aircraft had been chartered to take holiday makers to Ciudad Bolívar.
On August 26, 2009, a Cessna 208B Grand Caravan had to make an emergency landing on the way from Los Roques Airport to Santiago Mariño Caribbean International Airport after an engine failure. The passengers and crew were rescued by fishing and pleasure boats.

See also
List of defunct airlines of Venezuela

References

External links

 Official website

Defunct airlines of Venezuela
Airlines established in 1982
Airlines disestablished in 2018
Venezuelan companies established in 1982
Defunct companies of Venezuela